Sampyo Group is a South Korean manufacturer of construction materials, established in 1966. Headquartered in Seoul, it has an annual turnover of $3.0 billion. Its products include ready-mix concrete, construction aggregate, and fly ash.   In 1980, Sampyo Group extended its line of business to railway track and bridge construction by establishing Sampyo Engineering & Construction.

Sampyo Group also is involved in other line of industries such as mining, environmental services and logistics. Sampyo Group now has more than 20 subsidiary companies and plants in South Korea.

Group companies
Sampyo Corporation
Sampyo Industry
NRC
Sampyo Precast Concrete & Construction
Sampyo Railway
Pentrack
Sampyo Cement
Sampyo Resources Development

See also
Economy of South Korea

References

External links
Sampyo Homepage (in Korean)

Chemical companies of South Korea
Chemical companies established in 1966
1966 establishments in South Korea
Companies listed on the Korea Exchange
South Korean companies established in 1966